Brad Parscale (born January 3, 1976) is an American digital consultant and political advisor who served as the senior adviser for data and digital operations for Donald Trump's 2020 presidential campaign. He previously served as the digital media director for Donald Trump's 2016 presidential campaign and as campaign manager for Donald Trump's 2020 presidential campaign from February 2018 to July 2020, being replaced by Bill Stepien. On September 30, 2020, he provided a statement to Politico announcing that he was "stepping away from my company and any role in the campaign for the immediate future to focus on my family and get help dealing with the overwhelming stress."

Parscale began working for the Trump Organization in 2011, developing and designing websites and creating and managing digital media strategies. In early 2015, Trump hired Parscale and his firm, Giles-Parscale, to create a website for his exploratory campaign. When Trump declared himself a Republican candidate in 2015, he asked Parscale to update the exploratory campaign site into a "full-fledged presidential campaign website."

Throughout the Republican primary, Parscale was responsible on behalf of Trump for managing the website, as well as digital media strategies and online fundraising campaigns. In June 2016, Parscale was officially named digital media director for Trump for President campaign, overseeing all aspects of digital media and online fundraising, as well as traditional media strategy, like radio and television placements.

In January 2017, Parscale, along with senior Trump aide, Nick Ayers, launched America First Policies, an organization that promotes President Trump's agenda and White House initiatives.

Early life and education
Parscale was born in Topeka, Kansas. His father, Dwight Parscale, was an assistant attorney general in Kansas who ran unsuccessfully for Congress in 1974, age 28. In 1990, he ran unsuccessfully for state attorney general, both times as a Democrat. Dwight Parscale owned a restaurant and operated a string of other businesses over the years, with Brad's mother, Rita. In the 1990s, Dwight Parscale was the CEO of NewTek, a computer products company.

He then attended two junior colleges, playing basketball well enough to get an athletic scholarship at the University of Texas at San Antonio. His father relocated NewTek to San Antonio while Parscale was playing basketball there.

Parscale left UT-San Antonio after one year; a knee injury cost him his sports scholarship. He transferred to Trinity University, also in San Antonio, where he earned a bachelor's degree in finance, international business and economics, graduating in 1999.

Career

Early years 
Parscale moved to Orange County, California following graduation from college, to work for his father, then the CEO of animation-software company Electric Image; Parscale worked as the sales manager, at a salary of $95,000. The company filed for bankruptcy in August 2002, and Parscale and his parents returned to San Antonio. Electric Image animation software was reconstituted as Electric Image Animation System 3D (eias3d.com).

In San Antonio, Parscale became a website developer. In October 2005 he incorporated his website business, which mostly produced simple websites for brick-and-mortar businesses in the area. Parscale has said that he started the company with an initial investment of $500; real estate records show that he owned three San Antonio homes at the time.

Giles–Parscale 
After Parscale worked on several projects with graphic and web designer Jill Giles (who had her own small firm), the company Giles–Parscale was formed in July 2011. In early 2013, Parscale was also running another company, DevDemon, which marketed add-ons for web development; in a technology investment partnership (Turner Parscale LLC); and was involved in a physical therapy business. By May 2015, Giles-Parscale owned a 18,000 square foot building and had 46 employees and 800 clients.

In April 2012, the company was hired to build a website for Trump International Realty, after a deliberately low bid of $10,000. That led to further work in the Trump family: Trump Winery, the Eric Trump Foundation, and Caviar Complexe, Melania Trump’s line of skin-care products. It also led to the firm's extensive work for the Donald Trump 2016 presidential campaign, and Parscale becoming the campaign's digital director (see below).

In mid-2017, Parscale spun off his political work to a new company, Parscale Strategy, and relocated that business to Florida. In August 2017, the remaining company operations (commercial and consumer) were purchased by CloudCommerce, a penny-stock firm, in a deal valued at $9 million in stock, and were renamed Parscale Digital. CloudCommerce also acquired San Antonio-based Parscale Media, but not Florida-based Parscale Strategy; Parscale became a member of the CloudCommerce board of directors.

In June 2018, Giles Design Bureau was broken out as a separate entity, run by Giles, with a staff of 15; Giles remained a major stockholder in CloudCommerce.

2016 Donald Trump presidential campaign

In early 2015, Parscale's firm, Giles-Parscale, was hired to create a website for Donald Trump's exploratory campaign, charging $1,500 for the work. Between October and December 2015, Giles-Parscale was paid $21,000 by the Trump campaign.

Through the entire election cycle, Giles-Parscale was paid $94 million by the Trump campaign. In 2016, Parscale was named the campaign's digital director.

Parscale used social media advertisements with an experiment based strategy of different face expressions, font colors and slogans like "Basket of Deplorables." Parscale's specific roles included heading the oversight of the digital advertising, TV advertising, small dollar fundraising, direct mail, political and advertising budget, and was also the RNC liaison working daily with Katie Walsh who was then the Republican National Committee's chief of staff. He was also the head of the data science and research, which included polling. Parscale claims that after realizing Virginia and Ohio were unable to be swayed, he decided to re-allocate the campaign resources to Michigan and Wisconsin. This shift included the decision to send Trump to Michigan and Wisconsin and focus efforts heavily on the two states. This decision was instrumental in winning the election as Trump won both the historically democratic states.

Parscale heavily used employees from Facebook, Twitter, Google, and other platforms for the campaign advertisements and embedded them on his staff to navigate the Facebook, Twitter, and Google platforms so that his staff would utilize all capabilities of these platforms. He denied having any assistance linked to Russia. Parscale did not have data scientists or any digital team during the Republican Primary and did much of the social media advertising from his home.

Parscale was able to utilize Facebook advertising to directly target individual voters in swing states. Parscale later said that he was able to target specific universes (audiences) who cared about infrastructure and promoted Trump and his message to build back up the crumbling American infrastructure. Although he hired Cambridge Analytica to assist with microtargeting and Cambridge Analytica stated that it was the key to Trump's victory, Parscale denied that he gained assistance from the firm because he thinks that Cambridge Analytica's use of psychographics doesn't work. Parscale also said: "I understood early that Facebook was how Donald Trump was going to win. Twitter is how he talked to the people. Facebook was going to be how he won."

The Trump campaign initially had solely Donald Trump's personal funding to back his campaign. Parscale set up a major grassroots campaign on Facebook that brought in funding quickly from across the U.S. Parscale attributed the success of his vast social media presence to using the assistance offered by companies such as Facebook, Twitter, Snapchat and Google. He said that because the Trump campaign intended to spend $100 million on social media, companies in that area were prepared to assist the campaign in using that money effectively. The Washington Post later wrote that, in light of Trump's narrow electoral margin, Parscale could "justifiably take credit" for his victory.

The database of voter information that drove Parscale's social media advertising campaigns in the 2016 election was dubbed "Project Alamo", a name which eventually encompassed all of the associated fundraising and political advertising efforts.

2020 Donald Trump presidential campaign

On February 27, 2018, President Trump named Parscale his 2020 re-election campaign manager.

On March 2, 2018, Parscale founded "firewall company" Red State Data and Digital to allow working with the America First super PAC during the midterm elections, which Parscale claimed does not violate election rules prohibiting coordination between a campaign and a super PAC. Red State received more than $900,000 in business from America First Action.

On August 30, 2019, CNN reported that a pro-Trump super PAC paid thousands to a company owned by Parscale's wife.

In March 2020, The New York Times reported that Parscale was paying $15,000 a month to Lara Trump and Kimberly Guilfoyle, the wife and girlfriend respectively of Eric Trump and Donald Trump Jr., for campaign work.

On April 29, 2020, CNN reported that Trump was angry with Parscale about low poll numbers.

In June 2020, while working to get supporters to an upcoming campaign rally with President Trump in Tulsa, Oklahoma, Parscale reported that he had received over 800,000 requests for tickets to the event, according to The Washington Times. Despite this claim, many seats remained empty at the 19,000-seat arena. The Tulsa fire marshal estimated that fewer than 6,200 attended. In December 2020 Politico named Parscale's predictions for the size of the rally among "the most audacious, confident and spectacularly incorrect prognostications about the year".

On July 15, 2020, Trump tweeted that Parscale would be replaced in the role of campaign manager by Bill Stepien, but that Parscale would continue to advise the campaign.

Parscale's spending decisions for the Trump campaign were questioned after his departure as campaign manager. By that time, more than $800,000 had been spent by the Trump campaign on boosting Parscale's social media pages, and $39 million was given to two companies owned by Parscale. The campaign also purchased ads which appeared to be intended to please Trump himself, including more than $1 million in ads for Washington, D.C. media market. According to The New York Times, many of the Trump campaign's spending specifics were "opaque".

On September 30, 2020, Parscale provided a statement to Politico announcing that he was "stepping away from my company and any role in the campaign for the immediate future to focus on my family and get help dealing with the overwhelming stress"; campaign communications director Tim Murtaugh confirmed the statement.

Post-2020 election activities
Following election day, Parscale criticized the Trump campaign's strategy following his removal as campaign manager. He argued that Trump's response to the COVID-19 pandemic ultimately led to his defeat, but echoed Trump's claims of voter fraud as a factor. 

After the election, Parscale turned to real estate flipping, restarted his political consulting firm, and formed a data analysis startup. As of October 2021, he was working for the 2022 Ohio gubernatorial campaign of former Republican congressman Jim Renacci against the incumbent Republican, Governor Mike DeWine.

Reaction to January 6th Attack on the United States Capitol

On July 12, 2022, the 7th Hearing of the Select Committee to Investigate the January 6th Attack on the United States Capitol revealed that after the attack, Parscale exchanged text messages with senior campaign advisor and "Save America" rally liaison Katrina Pierson. In these messages, Parscale equates Donald Trump's rhetoric with fomenting civil war and blames his former boss for the death of supporter Ashli Babbitt. He expresses remorse for helping him become President:

Despite these private exchanges, Parscale continued to support Trump and his assertion that the 2020 election was stolen. Exactly one month later, Parscale tweeted the following message to his Twitter followers, but addressed it directly to the ex-President:

Personal life
Parscale became a father in July 1999. His daughter's mother was a 22-year-old woman whom he had met while she was working at a San Antonio tanning salon. The couple married in March 2003. Parscale filed for divorce in August 2004; the divorce was finalized in October 2007.

In the summer of 2012, he married Candice Blount. As of July 2019, the couple owned three residences in Fort Lauderdale, Florida.

2020 breakdown
On September 27, 2020, Parscale was hospitalized after his wife told Fort Lauderdale police that he had guns and he was threatening to harm himself; upon arriving at Parscale's home, an officer reported that "Bradley’s speech was slurred as though he was under the influence of an alcoholic beverage and he seemed to be crying." Officers seized 10 firearms from the home and reported that Parscale's wife had cuts and bruises on her arms and face, which she said Parscale had inflicted earlier in the week, though she later said that her statements had been "misconstrued" and denied that Parscale had been violent toward her. Parscale was detained and involuntarily committed and psychiatrically examined under terms of the Baker Act. Politico reported that the couple had shared that they had felt distressed since the 2016 death of their prematurely born twins.

References

External links

Giles–Parscale
Americafirstpolicies.org
TechBloc

1976 births
American campaign managers
American people of English descent
Donald Trump 2016 presidential campaign
Donald Trump 2020 presidential campaign
Kansas Republicans
Living people
People associated with the 2016 United States presidential election
People from Topeka, Kansas
Trinity University (Texas) alumni